Chandpara Bani Vidya Bithi  is a higher secondary school in Chandpara of North 24 Parganas district, West Bengal. Over 1,700 students are enrolled at this school. Established in 1950 with the help of Late Mahendranath Roy & Late Mahendranath Ghosh as its founder Headmaster, Chandpara Bani Vidya Bithi (H.S.) School is one of the pioneering institutions in Gaighata East Circle. The chair of the Head of the institution was also graced by the august presence of Late Keshablal Biswas (TIC), Sri Ramesh Chandra Biswas (HM), Sri Nikhil Kumar Das (TIC). The list of ex-secretaries and ex-presidents under whose term and tenure the school has flourished deserves special mention here:

Name of the Secretary

1. Mahendranath Roy [03-04-1953]

2. Rajendranath Biswas

3. Krishnapada Das [From 25-11-1961 to 04-07-1970]

4. Kahjendranath Das

5. Byomkesh Dutta (Administrator) [From 05-03-1980 to 07-02-1981]

6. Mahendranath Ray [From 08-02-1981 to 31-12-1981]

7. Narayan Chakrabotty [From 26-01-1983 to 16-09-1984]

8. Monmotha Roy [16-09-1984]

9. Monmotha Roy [From 20-11-1988 to 30-06-1989]

10. Nikhil Chandra [From 22-07-1989 to 25-03-1992]

11. Nikhil Chandra [From 26-03-1992 to 26-05-1995]

12. Nikhil Chandra [From 27-05-1995 to 11-05-1999]

13. Prafulla Kumar Bisaws [From 12-05-1999 to 12-05-2002]

14. Prafulla Kumar Bisaws [From 13-05-2002 to 10-05-2005]

15. Sukhomoy Dev [From 11-05-2005 to 23-02-2009]

16. Sachinandan Saha [From 24-02-2009 to 10-06-2012]

17. Subhas Mondal [(Administrator) From 11-06-2012 to 29-01-2013]

18. Tarun Mondal [From 30-01-2013 to 01-04-2015]

19. Rabiul Islam (HM) [From 01-05-2015 — ]

Name of the Presidents

1. Sri Kalipada Ghosh [03-04-1953]

2. Krishnapada Das

3. Mahendra Nath Ray [From 25-11-1961 to 31-03-1972]

4. Krishnapada Tarafder [From 08-02-1981 to 16-09-1984]

5. S. I. Bongaon [16-09-1984]

6. Narayan Tarafder [From 20-11-1988 to 25-03-1992]

7. Subhas Chandra Saha [From 15-01-1993 to 26-05-1995]

8. Narayan Tarafder [From 26-03-1992 to 11-11-1992]

9. Surajit Sarkar [From 21-05-1996 to 11-05-1999]

10. Madan Mohan Mondal [From 27-05-1995 20-05-1996]

11. Santosh Saha [From 12-05-1999 to 26-07-2000]

12. Monmotha Basak [From 26-07-2000 to 12-05-2002]

13. Gitesh Chandra Ghosh [From 13-05-2002 to 10-05-2005]

14. Pannalal Chakraborty [From 11-05-2005 to 23-02-2009]

15. Biswanath Sarkar [From 30-07-2010 to 10-06-2012]

16. Late Asim Kumar Podder [From 24-02-2009 to 29-07-2010]

17. Late Asim Kumar Podder [From 30-01-2013 to 01-04-2015]

18. Santipada Biswas [From 01-05-2015 — ]

 COURSES OFFERED [CLASS XI-XII]

References

External links
School website

Schools in North 24 Parganas district
1950 establishments in West Bengal
Educational institutions established in 1950